Lodi is an unincorporated community in Washington County, Virginia, United States. It owes its name to the Italian city of Lodi.

References

Unincorporated communities in Washington County, Virginia
Unincorporated communities in Virginia